Puriri is a small locality on the Hauraki Plains of New Zealand. It lies approximately 14 km south-east of Thames, New Zealand.

Puriri was originally a Ngāti Maru settlement, which the Rev. Henry Williams visited in October 1833, when the Church Missionary Society (CMS) missionaries, William Thomas Fairburn, John Alexander Wilson, John Morgan and James Preece established a mission station in the settlement, In 1835 James Stack was appointed to Puriri. However, the missionaries withdrew from the mission that same year as the result of fighting in the Waikato. Fairburn returned to the Puriri Mission at the end of the fighting. Preece took over the mission in 1834 with the assistance of the Rev. James Hamlin. In 1838 the station was transferred to Parawai (part of the present town of Thames).

In 1868 Puriri was the location for an official goldfield during the Thames-Coromandel gold rush.

Puriri railway station was to the west of the village  from Morrinsville and was open from 1898 to 1951. The former railway is now used by the Hauraki Trail.

Demographics
Puriri is described by Statistics New Zealand as a rural settlement. Puriri is part of the larger Matatoki-Puriri statistical area.

Puriri had a population of 234 at the 2018 New Zealand census, an increase of 30 people (14.7%) since the 2013 census, and an increase of 12 people (5.4%) since the 2006 census. There were 87 households, comprising 114 males and 123 females, giving a sex ratio of 0.93 males per female. The median age was 41.6 years (compared with 37.4 years nationally), with 54 people (23.1%) aged under 15 years, 39 (16.7%) aged 15 to 29, 102 (43.6%) aged 30 to 64, and 45 (19.2%) aged 65 or older.

Ethnicities were 92.3% European/Pākehā, 19.2% Māori, 1.3% Pacific peoples, and 1.3% other ethnicities. People may identify with more than one ethnicity.

Although some people chose not to answer the census's question about religious affiliation, 59.0% had no religion, 29.5% were Christian and 1.3% had other religions.

Of those at least 15 years old, 18 (10.0%) people had a bachelor's or higher degree, and 51 (28.3%) people had no formal qualifications. The median income was $36,300, compared with $31,800 nationally. 21 people (11.7%) earned over $70,000 compared to 17.2% nationally. The employment status of those at least 15 was that 108 (60.0%) people were employed full-time, and 21 (11.7%) were part-time.

Education
Puriri School is a coeducational full primary (years 1-8) school with a decile rating of 7 and a roll of 31. The school celebrated its 80th anniversary in 1961 and its 125th anniversary in 2003. There was an earlier school called Puriri School, which flourished in 1837.

References

External links
 Puriri School website
1947 photo of train arriving at Puriri

Populated places in Waikato
Thames-Coromandel District